Golden Week may refer to:

Golden Week (China), two weeks of Chinese holidays, occurring in January or February, and September or October
Golden Week (Japan), several Japanese holidays that occur during the first week of May
Golden Week (Ohio), an early voting period in Ohio, US